Hohe Schule may refer to:

 Hohe Schule (film), a 1934 Austrian film also called The Secret of Cavelli
 Hohe Schule (university), an alternative name for the University of Ingolstadt
 Hohe Schule, Herborn, a former higher education institute in Germany
 Hohe Schule, Loosdorf, a former Lutheran German grammar school (gymnasium) in Loosdorf, Austria
 Hohe Schule (hill), a hill in Bavaria, Germany
 Hohe Schule (equestrianism), a form of dressage in haute ecole riding
 Advanced School of the NSDAP, the ideological university of the Nazi Party